Alfred Brackpool (11 October 1857 – 24 October 1927) was an English cricketer who played in one first-class cricket match for Sussex.  Brackpool was a right-handed batsman who bowled right-arm medium-pace.  He was born at Crawley Down, Sussex.

Brackpool made a single first-class appearance for Sussex against the Marylebone Cricket Club at Lord's in 1880.  In Sussex's first innings he was dismissed for 2 runs by George Hearne.  He took the wicket of Thomas Pearson in the Marylebone Cricket Club's first-innings, finishing with figures of 1/62 from 34 overs.  Sussex followed-on in their second-innings, during which he was dismissed for a duck by James Robertson, with the Marylebone Cricket Club winning by an innings and 178 runs.  This was his only major appearance for Sussex.

He died at Worth, Sussex on 24 October 1927.

References

External links
Alfred Brackpool at ESPNcricinfo
Alfred Brackpool at CricketArchive

1857 births
1927 deaths
People from Crawley Down
English cricketers
Sussex cricketers